Auburn Council may be:

 City of Auburn, Sydney, Australia
 Auburn Council BSA, Maine, United States of America
 Auburn Council BSA, New York, United States of America